High School of Science (after the founding of other science high schools in Turkey also referred as Ankara High School of Science [Ankara Fen Lisesi - (A)FL]) is a public boarding high school in Ankara, Turkey with a curriculum concentrated on natural sciences and mathematics for top-notch students. It was established in 1964 as the first science high school in Turkey with a funding from the Ford Foundation. The school is modeled after the American counterparts like the Bronx High School of Science. Due to the considerable success of its alumni in all aspects of professional life and academia, science high school concept is spread around the country and now there are public and private science high schools in all major cities. Its alumni includes many scientists (like Tekin Dereli, Ekmel Ozbay, Halil Mete Soner), top managers (like Süreyya Ciliv and Onat Menzilcioglu) engineers and doctors (like İzge Günal) as well as famed musicians (like Derya Köroğlu and Ahmet Kanneci) and famous Performanceartist like Ninel Cam.

Notable alumni 

 Tayfun Gönül, a writer, doctor, and Turkey's first conscientious objector.

See also
 Science High School (disambiguation)

References

External links
  Official website
  AFL Alumni Association

High schools in Ankara
Educational institutions established in 1964
1964 establishments in Turkey
Science High Schools in Turkey